José Angel Vidro (born August 27, 1974) is a Puerto Rican born former Major League Baseball second baseman.  He played for the Montreal Expos/Washington Nationals and Seattle Mariners.

Professional career

Montreal Expos/Washington Nationals
Vidro was drafted in the sixth round of the 1992 amateur draft by the Montreal Expos from Blanca Malaret High School in Sabana Grande, Puerto Rico. He spent four seasons in the minor leagues before making his major league debut on June 8, 1997. He was primarily a reserve infielder for the Expos in 1997 and 1998. Vidro is the first of three players, including Robinson Cancel (New York Mets) and Jonathan Sánchez (San Francisco Giants), from Sabana Grande to make it to the major leagues.

In 1999, Vidro became a full-time player as the Expos starting second baseman. He hit .304 with 12 home runs and 59 RBI and was second in the National League with 45 doubles.

In 2000, Vidro was named an All-Star for the first time in his career. His career high .330 batting average on the season was seventh-best in the NL. His 200 hits were second-best in the NL and his 51 doubles were good for third-best. He also set career high numbers with 24 home runs and 97 RBI. Vidro continued as the starting second baseman for the Expos in 2001 when he hit .319 with 15 home runs and 59 RBI.

Vidro made the NL All-Star team in both 2002 and 2003, hitting over .300 both seasons and winning the Silver Slugger as the best hitting 2nd baseman in the NL in 2003. Vidro played three more seasons with the franchise, including the first two seasons when the Expos moved and became the Washington Nationals. Due to injuries to his right knee, ankle, and quadriceps muscle, Vidro played in only 87 games for the Washington Nationals in 2005, 8 of which were as a pinch hitter.

Seattle Mariners
On December 14, 2006, the Nationals traded Vidro to the Seattle Mariners for outfielder Chris Snelling and pitcher Emiliano Fruto.  Vidro spent two seasons with Seattle primarily playing DH. He hit .314 in 147 games in 2007, but hit only six home runs while slugging .394.

On August 5, 2008, the Mariners designated Vidro for assignment, and he was released on August 13. He was hitting .234 with seven home runs and 45 RBI at the time.

Career statistics

Vidro played 1046 games at second base, 45 games at third base, 42 games at first base and 3 games at left field.

References

External links

1974 births
Living people
Burlington Bees players
Harrisburg Senators players
Major League Baseball players from Puerto Rico
Major League Baseball second basemen
Montreal Expos players
National League All-Stars
People from Mayagüez, Puerto Rico
Washington Nationals players
Ottawa Lynx players
Potomac Nationals players
Puerto Rican expatriate baseball players in Canada
Seattle Mariners players
Silver Slugger Award winners
West Palm Beach Expos players